The Summerland Project is a stage play and subsequent movie adaptation written by Rob Merritt about a dying woman whose mind is placed into an artificial body.

Plot
Amelia and Carter Summerland are a newly married couple. Amelia has an aneurysm and becomes locked in. Carter is approached by a corporation who would like to use Amelia as a test subject for a procedure where they will copy her personality and memories into an android body.

The themes of The Summerland Project have been compared to Pygmalion, Blade Runner (and its source material Do Androids Dream of Electric Sheep?), Frankenstein, and The Monkey's Paw. The story raises questions about the nature of humanity.

Play

The play was initially produced as part of the Theatre Cedar Rapids Underground New Play Festival in 2011. It then again appeared as a TCR mainstage production in 2013. Subsequently, the play was performed at the Olathe Civic Theatre in Kansas City, Kansas.

Film

Filming for the movie version, entitled Amelia 2.0 began on September 16, 2014 in Cedar Rapids, Iowa. The film version features Ben Whitehair, Ed Begley Jr., Chris Ellis, Eddie Jemison, Kate Vernon, Debra Wilson, Kamar de los Reyes, Malorie Mackey, as well as Angela Billman reprising the role of Amelia Summerland that she performed in the 2013 stage version. The film version is being directed by Adam Orton. The film is targeted for release for the 2016 film festival season. The film had a budget of $1.2 million.

External links
 play website
 movie facebook
 
 The Summerland Project Pelicula Trailer

References

American plays
American independent films
American science fiction films
Android (robot) films
Brain transplantation in fiction
Films about technology